The European Technology Platform for Wind Energy (TPWind) is a European Seventh Framework Programme initiative to improve the competitive situation of the European Union in the field of wind energy.

The programme is a joint initiative (Public-Private Partnership) of the European Commission, representing the European Union, and the industry. The main objective of the programme is to produce a Strategic Research Agenda (SRA).

See also
 European Technology Platform
 Joint Technology Initiative

References
 Vision document

External links
 European Technology Platform for Wind Energy

Science and technology in Europe
European Union and science and technology 
Tech